Waleed Abdulkarim El Khereiji or Waleed A. Elkhereiji (born 14 September 1958) is the member of the ruling class in Saudi Arabia.
 From Dec. 8, 2014 to Jan. 29, 2015 he was Agriculture Minister.
 On February 14, 2015, Salman ibn Abd al-Aziz appointed him a member of his Shura.
 Since 17 April 2017 he is ambassador to Ankara. This period includes the assassination of Jamal Khashoggi on the 2nd of October 2018 (which he denied knowledge of).

See also 
 Mohammad al-Otaibi (Saudi consul general in Istanbul).

References 

1958 births
Living people
Government ministers of Saudi Arabia
People from Medina
Ambassadors of Saudi Arabia to Turkey